Mea Maxima Culpa: Silence in the House of God is a 2012 documentary film directed by Alex Gibney. The film details the first known protest against clerical sex abuse in the United States by four deaf men. It features the voices of actors Jamey Sheridan, Chris Cooper, Ethan Hawke and John Slattery, who provide the voices of the deaf interviewees.

The title is derived from the Latin phrase "mea maxima culpa". It is taken from the Confiteor that is part of the Roman Catholic Mass. It literally means "my great fault", but it is commonly translated into English as "Through my most grievous fault".
Mea Maxima Culpa: Silence in the House of God (2012)
Executive Producer Lori Singer

Synopsis
 
The film follows documentary filmmaker Alex Gibney as he examines the abuse of power in the Catholic Church system through the story of four deaf men—Terry Kohut, Gary Smith, Pat Kuehn and Arthur Budzinski—who set out to expose the priest who abused them during the mid-1960s at St. John's School for the Deaf. Each of the men brought forth the first known case of public protest against clerical sex abuse, which later led to the sex scandal case known as the Lawrence Murphy case. Through their case the film follows a cover-up that winds its way from the row houses of Milwaukee, Wisconsin, through Ireland's churches, all the way to the highest office of the Vatican.

Release
The film premiered on September 9, 2012, at the 2012 Toronto International Film Festival. It later opened in limited release on November 16, 2012, and premiered worldwide on HBO on February 4, 2013.

Reaction

Critical response

The film received positive feedback from critics. Review aggregation website Rotten Tomatoes gives the film a score of 98% based on reviews from 42 critics, with a rating average of 7.8 out of 10. Metacritic, which assigns a weighted average score out of 100 to reviews from mainstream critics, reports the film with a score of 73 based on 16 reviews.

Mark Jenkins of NPR called the film "Alex Gibney's most powerful film since the Oscar-winning 2007 Taxi to the Dark Side." A. O. Scott of The New York Times particularly praised the way that the interviews of the victims were shot writing, "Mr. Gibney films them, against dark backgrounds with soft, indirect light, emphasizes the expressivity of their faces and hands, and will remind hearing viewers of the richness and eloquence of American Sign Language." Roger Ebert of the Chicago Sun-Times felt the film on a personal level, writing, "To someone who was raised and educated in the Catholic school system, as I was, a film like this inspires shock and outrage." He went on to write that the film "is calm and steady, founded largely on the testimony of Murphy's victims."

Awards
In 2013, Mea Maxima Culpa was nominated for six Primetime Emmy Awards, and won in three categories, including Exceptional Merit In Documentary Filmmaking. It won a Peabody Award in 2013 "for providing a harrowing story of clerical sexual abuse, empowering long-silenced victims and unveiling clandestine Church practices around accusations." Additionally, Gibney received his fourth nomination for Best Documentary Screenplay from the Writers Guild of America for this film.

See also
 Catholic sex abuse cases
 Deliver Us from Evil (2006), a documentary about a sex abuse case in Northern California
 Holy Water-Gate (2004 documentary)
 Twist of Faith (2005), another HBO documentary film about abuse in the Catholic Church.

References

External links
 
 

2012 films
2012 documentary films
American independent films
American documentary films
Documentary films about child abuse
Films directed by Alex Gibney
Documentary films about Christianity in the United States
Catholic Church sexual abuse scandals in the United States
Peabody Award-winning broadcasts
Films about activists
Documentary films about deaf people
Media coverage of Catholic Church sexual abuse scandals
Catholic Church in Wisconsin
Education in Wisconsin
Roman Catholic Archdiocese of Milwaukee
Catholic Church sexual abuse scandals in Ireland
HBO documentary films
2010s English-language films
2010s American films